Sir William Woods KH FSA (17 August 1785 - 25 July 1842) was an officer of arms at the College of Arms in London.  Woods was a bastard of unknown paternity. He used the name and arms of George Woods, a London tailor, but was said to be the son of the Duke of Norfolk. George IV was a close friend. In 1815 Woods was appointed Secretary to the Knights-Commander and Companions of the Order of the Bath, and registrar of the Guelphic Order, and in 1819 he became Bluemantle Pursuivant at the College of Arms (to this was added the position of Norfolk Herald in 1825). He was appointed Clarenceux King of Arms in 1831, and promoted to Garter in 1838.

Woods had two mistresses and at least six children. One of his sons, Albert William, went on to become Garter in 1869. He died at Lauriestone Lodge, his home in Hampstead, and was buried in Hampstead Church.

Arms

References

1785 births
1842 deaths
English officers of arms
Knights Bachelor
Garter Principal Kings of Arms